Vexillum chibaense is a species of small sea snail, marine gastropod mollusk in the family Costellariidae, the ribbed miters.

Description
The length of the shell attains 4.7 mm.

Distribution
This species occurs in the Pacific Ocean off Japan.

References

 Salisbury, R. A.; Rosenberg, G. (1999). Description of a new species of Pusia (Gastropoda: Costellariidae) from Japan. Proceedings of the Academy of Natural Sciences of Philadelphia. 149: 93-97.
 Turner H. 2001. Katalog der Familie Costellariidae Macdonald, 1860. Conchbooks. 1-100 page(s): 23

chibaense
Gastropods described in 1999